Clarence Augustus Chant (May 31, 1865 – November 18, 1956) was a Canadian astronomer and physicist.

Early life and education

Chant was born in Hagerman's Corners, Ontario to Christopher Chant and Elizabeth Croft. In 1882 he attended Markham High School, where he demonstrated a mathematical ability. After graduation, he attended St. Catherines Collegiate Institute and York County Model School in Toronto. He left to work as an instructor in 1884, and taught at Maxwell, Osprey Township for the following three years.

By 1887 he began studying mathematics and physics at the University College of the University of Toronto, graduating in 1890.

Career
Upon graduation, Chant became a civil servant in Ottawa, working as a temporary clerk in the office of the Auditor General. The job offered limited prospects; however, in 1891 he was offered a fellowship at University of Toronto, where he gained an appointment as a lecturer of physics the following year.

While working at the university he became interested in astronomy, and in 1892 he joined what would become the Royal Astronomical Society of Canada. He served as president of the organization from 1904 until 1907, and also performed editing duties for the society's journal until 1956. He also contributed articles to the journal and the annual Observer's Handbook.

In 1894 he married Jean Laidlaw, and the couple had two daughters and a son. He earned his master's degree in 1900, and was granted a leave of absence to study for a Doctorate at Harvard University. He returned to Toronto with his Ph.D. in 1901 became a professor. In 1905 he introduced optical astronomy courses at the University of Toronto, and was the sole astronomer at the university until 1924.

In 1913 he researched and wrote a paper for the Royal Astronomical Society of Canada about an unusual event, a meteor procession, that took place that year.  He lobbied the city of Toronto for an observatory, but the project was shelved with the advent of World War I.

During his career he joined five expeditions to observe solar eclipses, including the 1922 expedition that tested Einstein's theory that light could be deflected by a massive body. He performed early investigations into X-ray photography. In 1928 he published the book Our Wonderful Universe.

Chant worked with mining executive and amateur  astronomer David Alexander Dunlap to promote and develop plans for a world-class observatory for Canada. After Dunlap's death, his widow donated land for the observatory and provided financial backing for the project. In 1935 Chant's goal was achieved with the opening of the David Dunlap Observatory. He retired from the university when the observatory opened, and moved into the Observatory House, Richmond Hill. He died at 91 years of age during the November 1956 lunar eclipse while still residing at the Observatory House.

Awards and honors
 Asteroid 3315 Chant is named after him.
 The crater Chant on the Moon is named after him.

References

External links

 
Clarence Augustus Chant archival papers held at the University of Toronto Archives and Records Management Services

Higher education in Canada
Organizations established in 1922
1865 births
1956 deaths
University of Toronto alumni
Harvard University alumni
20th-century Canadian astronomers
19th-century Canadian astronomers
Presidents of the Royal Astronomical Society of Canada